Dato' Haji Ahmad bin Lebai Sudin (born 11 November 1958) is a Malaysian politician who is currently the Bukit Lada (N9) assemblyman in the Kedah State Legislative Assembly. Ahmad is a member of the United Malays National Organisation (UMNO) in Malaysia's ruling Barisan Nasional coalition. He holds degree with Honors in Sociology and Anthropology from University Malaya (class of 1982). Immediately after attending UM, Ahmad went to Malaysia National Institute of Public Administration (INTAN) and received his Diploma in Public Management (class of 1983). He has been praised for improving the quality of agriculture in Bukit Lada especially during his tenure as Exco Kedah in 1999.

Early life 
Ahmad hails from Kampung Panchor, Pokok Sena, Kedah, Malaysia. He is the son of Hajah Yah binti Lebai Dahaman and Lebai Sudin bin Lebai Ahmad. His father found Kampong Panchor during the Japan invasion in Tanah Melayu. Both of his parents are from the local ulama's lineage, thus the name Lebai.

Political Achievements 
 ADUN Kawasan Bukit Lada (1995-1999, 2013–present)
 Ketua UMNO Bahagian Pokok Sena (1998 - 2013)
 Ketua Pemuda UMNO Cawangan Kg  Panchor, Pokok Sena, Bahagian Padang Terap (1983 – 1990)
 Jawatankuasa Pergerakan Pemuda UMNO Bahagian Padang Terap (1986)
 Jawatankuasa UMNO Bahagian Padang Terap (1990)
 Ketua Pergerakan Pemuda UMNO Bahagian Padang Terap (1993)
 Ketua Pergerakan Pemuda UMNO Bahagian Pokok Sena (1994)
 Naib Ketua Pergerakan Pemuda UMNO Negeri Kedah (1993 – 1994)
 Ketua Pergerakan Pemuda UMNO Negeri Kedah  (1994 – 1996)
 EXCO Pergerakan Pemuda UMNO Malaysia (1993 – 1996)
 Timbalan Pengerusi Biro Hal Ehwal Islam Pemuda UMNO Malaysia (1994 – 1995)
 Pengerusi Biro Hal Ehwal Islam Pemuda UMNO Malaysia (1995 – 1996)
 Pengerusi Biro Hal Ehwal Islam UMNO Negeri Kedah (1998 – 1999)
 Ahli Jawatankuasa Badan Perhubungan UMNO Negeri Kedah (1993 – 2013)
 Setiausaha Barisan Nasional Negeri Kedah (1999 – 2004)

Defamation Suit Controversy 
Ahmad wins defamation suit against Datuk Ariffin Man, who is also the Kedah Barisan Nasional (BN) Executive Secretary. Ariffin Man was ordered by the High Court  to pay RM150,000 in damages to Bukit Lada assemblyman Datuk Ahmad Lebai Sudin for uttering defamatory remarks in his speech in Dewan Sri Tanjung, Santap, Pokok Sena, Kedah.

Election Results

Honours
  :
  Knight Companion of the Order of Loyalty to the Royal House of Kedah (DSDK) – Dato' (2002)

References 

1958 births
Living people
Malaysian people of Malay descent
Malaysian Muslims
People from Kedah
Members of the Kedah State Legislative Assembly
Kedah state executive councillors
United Malays National Organisation politicians
University of Malaya alumni